Ostrinia sanguinealis is a moth in the family Crambidae. It was described by Warren in 1892. It is found in China, Japan and Russia.

Subspecies
Ostrinia sanguinealis sanguinealis (Japan)
Ostrinia sanguinealis cathayensis Mutuura & Munroe, 1970 (China)

References

Moths described in 1892
Pyraustinae